Magic Fountain may refer to:
 The Magic Fountain, a 1961 film
 Magic Fountain (film), a 1963 film
 Magic Fountain (EP), an EP by Art vs. Science
 "Magic Fountain" (song)
 Magic Fountain of Montjuïc, in Barcelona